Lepraria juanfernandezii is a species of dust lichen in the family Stereocaulaceae. It was formally described as a new species by Martin Kukwa in 2019. The type was collected from Robinson Crusoe Island (Juan Fernández Islands, Chile). Here it was found growing on bryophytes that were growing on a rock. It is only known from the type locality. The lichen contains divaricatic acid, a secondary metabolite known to exist in six other Lepraria species.

References

juanfernandezii
Lichen species
Lichens described in 2019
Fungi of the Juan Fernández Islands